Wakeman may refer to:

Places 
 Wakeman, Ohio, United States
The Wakeman School and Arts College, a secondary school in Shrewsbury, UK
Wakeman Sound, a sound on the coast of British Columbia, Canada
Wakeman River, a river flowing south into the head of Wakeman Sound

Other uses
 Wakeman (surname)
 In the city of Ripon, England, the wakeman presided over a nightly curfew. Relics of this tradition still exist.